Patten is a census-designated place (CDP) and the primary village in the town of Patten, Penobscot County, Maine, United States. It is in the northeast part of the town, mostly on the north side of Fish Stream, an east-flowing tributary of the West Branch Mattawamkeag River and part of the Penobscot River watershed.

Maine State Route 11 passes through the village, leading north  to Ashland and south  to Sherman and Interstate 95. State Route 159 leads east  from Patten to Island Falls and the same distance northwest to Shin Pond.

Patten was first listed as a CDP prior to the 2020 census.

Demographics

References 

Census-designated places in Penobscot County, Maine
Census-designated places in Maine